Repligen is an American company devoted to the development and production of materials used in the manufacture of biological drugs.  The company is based in Waltham, Massachusetts, and incorporated in Delaware in 1981.  A public company, Repligen is listed on the NASDAQ exchange under the symbol RGEN.  , Repligen employed 116 people, about 50% of these based in Sweden.

Business model 
Before 2012, Repligen maintained dual capabilities in developing pharmaceutical therapeutics (drug discovery and development) and the development of materials supporting biological drug manufacture (bioprocessing business).  A decision was made in 2012 to focus on the bioprocessing business and reduce research and development expenditures.  In the period of 2010 to 2013, the majority of sales by the company were concentrated in the single Protein A product line.

Sales and revenue 
Repligen employs a direct sales model to users of its products in the United States, with some sales through intermediaries in "certain foreign markets".  More than 80% of sales have been to customers in the United States and Sweden during the 2010-2013 period.  Long-term supply agreements have been established with major customers of the Protein A products, agreements which expire between 2016 and 2021 barring re-negotiation.

As a result of royalty-generating out-licensing, royalty revenue from Bristol-Myers Squibb has been in the 27% to 37% range as a proportion of total revenue during the 2010-2013 period; in comparison to revenue from sales, the largest customer accounted for 35% to 45% of revenue during the same period.

As a consequence of current operations, about one-third each of revenue and cost and expenses are denominated in Swedish krona currency, the remaining two-thirds denominated in United States dollars; this presents an element risk to the business based on unpredictable fluctuations in currency exchange rates.

Intellectual property 
The company's Protein A-related offerings are supported by proprietary technology, trade secrets and patent filings.  One patent was granted in April 2010 and has been extended so that it remains in effect until 2028.,  Patents are pending on elements of the OPUS chromatography product line, and enabling technology has been licensed from BioFlash Partners.  Repligen retains an exclusive license to intellectual property owned by the University of Michigan in relation to the Orencia product divested to Bristol-Myers Squibb.,

Facilities
Repligen's company headquarters are housed together with its manufacturing facility in Waltham, Massachusetts.

Repligen maintains manufacturing facilities in Waltham, Massachusetts and Lund, Sweden.  Growth factor products and the native form of Protein A are manufactured in Sweden; recombinant forms of Protein A are manufactured in both the United States and Sweden; assembly of the OPUS chromatography product line is done in the United States.

The lease on the main Waltham facility extends through 2023.  A second, smaller Waltham facility was leased through the end of 2012 and is now rented on a monthly basis.  In Lund, four buildings are under lease, three expiring in mid-2017 and the fourth extending to late 2019.

Corporate history and governance
Alexander Rich was a co-founder of Repligen; in 2014 at the age of 87, Dr. Rich is "Chairman Emeritus".of Repligen's Board of Directors. Dr. Rich had been a member of the Board since 1981.  Paul Schimmel is also a co-founder of Repligen; in 2014 at the age of 74, he is the Ernest and Jean Hahn Professor at The Skaggs Institute for Chemical Biology at The Scripps Research Institute. He used to be the John D. and Catherine T. MacArthur Professor of Biochemistry and Biophysics in the Department of Biology at MIT.

, the company's President and Chief Executive Officer is Tony J. Hunt.

Acquisitions and in-licensing 
In early 2010, Repligen licensed technology from BioFlash which it subsequently incorporated into the OPUS line of pre-packaged chromatography columns.

In 2011, Repligen acquired bioproduction assets from Novozymes for $26.4 million, which doubled the company's bioprocessing capabilities.

In December 2016 the company acquired TangenX for $39 million

Divestments and out-licensing 
In 2008, an agreement was struck to divest certain intellectual property rights to Bristol-Myers Squibb around the drug Orencia in exchange for ongoing royalty payments through the end of 2013.

At the end of 2012, Repligen out-licensed its spinal muscular atrophy program, in particular the small molecule candidate drug RG3039, to Pfizer.  This divestment included licensing rights to two patents to Pfizer.,,

Terminations and moth-balling 
Development of an imaging agent, designated RG1068, based on a synthetic human hormone was halted in 2012 following a request by the USFDA for additional safety and efficacy data beyond that provided in a New Drug Application (NDA) submission; a Marketing Authorization Application had been submitted in parallel to the EMA.

Products and services 
Repligen is a major supplier of Protein A, both native and recombinant forms, to the pharmaceutical industry.  In 2010-2013, Protein A accounted for the majority of the company's product sales.  The company also provides growth factors to increase the productivity of cell-based bioproduction, multiple alternating tangential flow (ATF) systems, and a line (OPUS) of chromatography columns scaled to manufacture of product for testing in clinical trials.

The OPUS product line contains a range of column sizes, the size and composition of which are dependent upon customer requirements, thus the full name of "Open Platform, User Specified".  The smaller sizes of columns depend upon proprietary technology licensed from BioFlash Partners, while the larger sizes are based on Repligen-developed proprietary technology.

Notes

References

External links

Manufacturing support companies
Companies based in Massachusetts
Companies listed on the Nasdaq
1981 establishments in Massachusetts